The Commonwealth Railways C class was a class of  passenger locomotives built in 1938 by Walkers Limited, Maryborough, for the Commonwealth Railways, Australia.

History
Following the extension of Commonwealth Railways' standard gauge line from Port Augusta to Port Pirie in 1937, and with increasing loads being hauled on the Trans-Australian Railway, an order was placed with Walkers Limited, Maryborough for eight 4-6-0 passenger locomotives to the same design as the New South Wales Government Railways' C36 class, but with higher capacity tenders.

All were delivered between January and April 1938. The new locomotives were able to shave 10 hours off the journey time of the Trans Australian. Four were converted to burn oil during the 1949 coal strike, being converted back to coal burning after the strike ended.

With the arrival of the GM class diesels, the first was withdrawn in January 1952 and by early 1953 only two remained. The last was withdrawn in September 1957. The locomotives were scrapped, but the tenders were converted into water carriers for use on the Commonwealth Railways weed killer train, still being in use in the early 1980s.

References

Notes

Bibliography

External links

C class
Railway locomotives introduced in 1938
Walkers Limited locomotives
4-6-0 locomotives
Standard gauge locomotives of Australia
Scrapped locomotives
Passenger locomotives